The RüKB Nos. 51Mh–53Mh were German narrow gauge steam locomotives operated by the Rügen narrow gauge railway on the island of Rügen in the Baltic Sea. They were absorbed in 1949 into the Deutsche Reichsbahn in East Germany as their Class 99.463.

History 
In 1913 and 1914 the Pomeranian provincial authorities, who had running powers for the following narrow gauge lines, bought a total of eight eight-coupled locomotives from Vulcan in Stettin grouping them as Class M:
 Kleinbahn Casekow–Penkun–Oder (1)
 Greifswald–Jarmener Kleinbahn (GJK) (1)
 Rügensche Kleinbahn (RüKB) (2)
 Demminer Kleinbahn West (2)
 Demminer Kleinbahn Ost (1)
 Kleinbahn Greifswald–Wolgast (1).

Because they proved themselves well, in 1925 a second locomotive was procured for both the GJK and the RüKB. These two engines were amongst the first superheated steam locomotives, unlike the first batch.  They were therefore classified as the Mh.

Because the superheated locomotives performed even better, in 1928 the RüKB decided to convert their older machines to superheating.

After the RüKB was taken over by the Deutsche Reichsbahn in 1949, the three engines were given the new running numbers 99 4631 to 99 4633.
In 1992 nos. 99 4632 and 4633 were given new boilers and cylinders at Raw Görlitz. Both locos were finally in service in the original green RüKB livery as locomotives 52 and 53 Mh.
No. 99 4631 became a monument from 1984 to 2002 at Lehrte but is now back with the RüKB, the others are still in operation as before on the island of Rügen. No. 99 4632 phase been working in black Reichsbahn colours since 2003.

See also 
 List of East German Deutsche Reichsbahn locomotives and railbuses
 List of preserved steam locomotives in Germany
 Rügensche Kleinbahn

References

Sources 
 
 
 

Narrow gauge steam locomotives of Germany
0-8-0T locomotives
Private locomotives of Germany
Railway locomotives introduced in 1913
750 mm gauge locomotives